Gibbaranea bituberculata is a species of 'orbweavers' belonging to the family Araneidae, subfamily Araneinae.

This species has a palearctic distribution and is present in most of Europe.

They can be encountered in sunny habitats on shrubs, edges and low plants, where they can make their webs near the ground.

Their basic color is very variable, but usually it is brownish, with whitish shades.  The cephalothorax (prosoma) is quite broad, with lying down hair. In the female the abdomen (opisthosoma) is large and spherical, with two small holes. They have eight eyes, with four relatively large eyes in the middle. Chelicerae are short and powerful, with teeth on the inside. The legs are moderately long and quite powerful.

Subspecies 
 Gibbaranea bituberculata bituberculata
 Gibbaranea bituberculata cuculligera (Simon, 1909)
 Gibbaranea bituberculata strandiana (Kolosvary, 1936)

References

External links 
 Fauna Europaea 
 Biolib
 Blocs.xtec.cat

Araneidae
Spiders of Europe
Spiders described in 1802
Palearctic spiders